Robert Montagu Poore  (20 March 1866 – 14 July 1938) was a cricketer and British army officer who, whilst serving in South Africa in 1896, played in three Test matches for the South African cricket team.  Much of his cricket was played when he held the rank of major, but he eventually became a brigadier-general.  "Of all the people in the history of the game," wrote Leo Cooper in an introduction to A. A. Thomson's Odd Men In, "he seems to stand for the Eccentric Ideal."

Military career

Poore was the son of Major Robert Poore (1834–1918) and his wife Juliana Lowry-Corry, daughter of Rear-Admiral Armar Lowry-Corry.

He joined the 7th Hussars and served in the Second Matabele War in Rhodesia 1896–1897. He was appointed provost marshal in South Africa during the Second Boer War 1899–1902, and received the Distinguished Service Order (DSO) in 1901. In a despatch dated 31 March 1900, the commander-in-chief, Lord Roberts, described how Poore "has exercised his responsible duties, whether as regards the care of prisoners, or in maintaining order in camp and on the line of march, in a most satisfactory manner".

Poore was provost marshal during the trial and execution of Breaker Morant and Peter Handcock, and his diary includes contemporary notes on their case.

Cricket career

In 1899, Poore became the most fertile run-scorer in all of England, hitting 1,399 runs (including seven hundreds) between 12 June and 12 August at an average of 116.58.  Against Somerset he made 304 and with fellow Army officer Captain Wynyard shared in a stand of over 400 for the sixth wicket – still the highest for that wicket in county cricket. In 21 innings over the course of the entire season, Poore managed 1,551 runs at 91.23, a record average for an English season not broken until Don Bradman averaged 98.66 in 1930. Poore was rewarded with selection as a Wisden Cricketer of the Year.

Poore returned to South Africa after the 1899 season to fight in the Boer War. After he returned to England, a broken arm caused him to miss most of the 1902 season, but he showed he retained his former skill with a superb innings of 62 not out against Hugh Trumble on a sticky wicket for Hampshire against the touring Australians. It was hoped Major Poore would be available again in 1903, but he went to India that summer and when he returned to Hampshire in the middle of 1904 to great expectations, his form was disappointing. Although there were few difficult pitches in the nine games he played, he averaged under twenty and only once (on a bad wicket against Sussex) did he show the skill that allowed him to dominate bowlers in 1899. In 1905 he again could not play at all, but he rejoined the team against Derbyshire in 1906 and in two matches scored 232 runs including 129 against Sussex, but another injury ended his season and as it turned out, his county career.

In spite of his impressive success, Poore was not yet overly enamoured with the game, which he had learnt not through classical coaching but the perusal of textbooks; certainly, it was not the only field in which his prodigious talents lay: he was a first-rate swordsman, shot and polo player, and once won the West of India lawn tennis championship.  Not until, as a subaltern, he visited India with the 7th Hussars did he realise his love for cricket, a love that he sustained all through his life. Poore remained a dangerous batsman in club games right up to his mid-fifties, and played first-class cricket in India as late as 1913.

Family
In 1898 Poore married Lady Flora Mary Ida Douglas-Hamilton (1866–1957), daughter of Captain Charles-Douglas-Hamilton, and sister of the 13th Duke of Hamilton. The couple had no children. Three years after their marriage, Poore's sister Nina Mary Benita Poore (1878–1951), married her brother's brother-in-law, and became Duchess of Hamilton.

References

External links
 
 
Thomson, AA: Odd Men In (The Pavilion Library, 1985).
 Profile
 

1866 births
1938 deaths
People from Boscombe
Cricketers from Dublin (city)
Irish cricketers
South Africa Test cricketers
South African cricketers
English cricketers
Hampshire cricketers
Mumbai cricketers
Europeans cricketers
Gentlemen cricketers
Wisden Cricketers of the Year
Companions of the Order of the Indian Empire
Companions of the Distinguished Service Order
British Army personnel of the Second Boer War
British Army cavalry generals of World War I
Wiltshire Regiment officers
7th Queen's Own Hussars officers
People educated at Stubbington House School
Army and Navy cricketers
Marylebone Cricket Club cricketers
Military personnel from Dublin (city)
British Army generals